Liam Guthrie (born 9 April 1997) is an Australian cricketer. He plays first-class cricket and List A cricket for Western Australia and for Brisbane Heat in the Big Bash League.

Career 
He made his first-class debut for Western Australia against Tasmania on 16 February 2018 as part of the 2017–18 Sheffield Shield season. He made his List A debut on 2 March 2021, for Western Australia in the 2020–21 Marsh One-Day Cup. He made his Twenty20 debut on 6 December 2021, for the Brisbane Heat in the 2021–22 Big Bash League season. On 27 December 2021, he made the record for the most expensive bowling performance in Big Bash League history, bowling 2/70 off 4 overs against Melbourne Stars at an average of 17.50

References

1997 births
Living people
Australian cricketers
Western Australia cricketers
Brisbane Heat cricketers